Davide Zandiegiacomo (born 26 November 1972 in Auronzo di Cadore) is an Italian curler.

At the international level, he is a 2006 European Mixed Curling Championship silver medallist.

At the national level, he is a three-time Italian men's champion curler and a one-time Italian mixed champion curler.

Teams

Men's

Mixed

Private life
His older brother Gianpaolo Zandegiacomo, also an Italian curler, they was teammates played on European and World championships.

References

External links

 ABOUT US - zandegiacomo.it

Living people
1972 births
Sportspeople from the Province of Belluno
Italian male curlers
Italian curling champions